The Hook Up Plan is a comedy web television series and the second French series produced for Netflix after Marseille.

The show premiered on December 7, 2018, and Season 2 premiered on October 11, 2019. A special episode about the COVID-19 pandemic was added to Netflix on August 26, 2020 in France.

In December 2020, the show was renewed for a third and final season, which premiered on January 1, 2022.

Premise
Elsa, on the verge of turning thirty and stuck in an uninspiring job, finds herself still hung up on her ex-boyfriend two years after their breakup. Her friends, hoping to help her break out of her rut and find some confidence, decide to hire a male escort to take her on a few dates.

Cast

Main cast
 Zita Hanrot: Elsa "El" Payette, Charlotte and Émilie's best friend
 Sabrina Ouazani: Charlotte "Cha" Ben Smires, Elsa and Émilie's best friend, Antoine's sister
 : Émilie "Milou" Chestnut, Elsa and Charlotte's best friend, and Antoine's partner
 Marc Ruchmann: Julio "Jules Dupont" Saldenha, the gigolo, Roman's best friend
 : Antoine Ben Smires, Matthieu and Maxime's friend, Charlotte's brother, and Émilie's partner
 Tom Dingler: Matthieu, Antoine and Maxime's friend
 Guillaume Labbé: Maxime "Max" Pauillac, Antoine and Matthieu's friend, and Elsa's ex-boyfriend
 Yvan Naubron: Roman, Julio's best friend
 Ludivine de Chastenet: Chantal, Elsa's colleague and friend

Recurring cast
 : Dr Philippe Payette, Elsa's father  (season 1) 
 Karina Testa: Manon, Antoine's colleague  (season 1) 
 : Anita Saldenha, Julio's mother  (season 1) 
 : Valérie, a regular client of Julio  (season 1) 
 Alexia Barlier: Gaïa, Maxime's new partner  (season 1) 
 : Audrey Payette, Elsa's mother  (season 1, season 3) 
 Aude Legastelois: Anaïs Payette, Elsa's sister  (season 1) 
 : Arthur, the intern  (season 2) 
 Aurélie Vérillon: Rachel, Julio's producer  (season 2)

Episodes

Season 1 (2018)

Season 2 (2019)

Season 3 (2022)

References

External links
 
 

2018 French television series debuts
French-language Netflix original programming
2010s French comedy television series
Television shows set in Paris